Virgil Sylvester Johnson (March 4, 1912 – September 9, 1993) was an American ice hockey player. Johnson played 76 games in the National Hockey League with the Chicago Black Hawks between 1938 and 1944, winning the Stanley Cup in 1938. The rest of his career, which lasted from 1931 to 1951, was mainly spent in the  American Hockey Association. He was inducted into the United States Hockey Hall of Fame in 1974.

Career statistics

Regular season and playoffs

External links
 
 

1912 births
1993 deaths
American men's ice hockey defensemen
Chicago Blackhawks players
Cleveland Barons (1937–1973) players
Hershey Bears players
Ice hockey people from Minneapolis
Minneapolis Millers (AHA) players
Minneapolis Millers (CHL) players
St. Paul Saints (AHA) players
Stanley Cup champions
United States Hockey Hall of Fame inductees